The 1965 Northern Illinois State Huskies football team represented Northern Illinois University as a member of the Interstate Intercollegiate Athletic Conference (IIAC) during the 1965 NCAA College Division football season. Led by tenth-year head coach Howard Fletcher, the Huskies compiled an overall record of 9–1 with a mark of 4–0 in conference play, winning the IIAC title. Northern Illinois was invited to the Mineral Water Bowl, where they lost to North Dakota. The Huskies playing their first three home games at Glidden Field before opening the newly-constructed Huskie Stadium on November 6 against .

Schedule

References

Northern Illinois
Northern Illinois Huskies football seasons
Interstate Intercollegiate Athletic Conference football champion seasons
Northern Illinois Huskies football